Marty Thomas Malloy (born July 6, 1972) is a former Major League Baseball second baseman who played two seasons, and current manager of the Clearwater Threshers. He played with the Atlanta Braves for 11 games during the 1998 season, and the Florida Marlins for 24 games during the 2002 season. 

Malloy was the subject of Paul Hemphill's 1996 book Heart of the Game: The Education of a Minor-League Ball Player.  Hemphill followed Malloy's struggles to make the major leagues as he played for the Durham Bulls.

From 2014 to 2016, Malloy managed the Gulf Coast Astros of the Gulf Coast League. Malloy managed the Lakewood BlueClaws of the South Atlantic League  from 2017-2018 before taking the reigns of the Clearwater Threshers in 2019.  

Malloy was named Minor League Field Director in 2021 before taking over as manager of the Clearwater Threshers when Milver Reyes was fired.

References

External links

1972 births
Living people
Major League Baseball second basemen
Baseball players from Gainesville, Florida
Atlanta Braves players
Florida Marlins players
Idaho Falls Gems players
Macon Braves players
Durham Bulls players
Greenville Braves players
Richmond Braves players
Toledo Mud Hens players
Lakeland Tigers players
Gulf Coast Tigers players
Louisville RiverBats players
Louisville Bats players
Las Vegas 51s players
Memphis Redbirds players
Minor league baseball managers
Sportspeople from Gainesville, Florida
Junior college baseball players in the United States